Frederick Richard Penn Curzon, 7th Earl Howe,  (born 29 January 1951), is a Conservative front bench member of the House of Lords. He is Deputy Leader of the House of Lords and former Minister of State for Defence. Howe is the longest continuously serving Conservative frontbencher, having held a front bench role in some capacity since 1991.

Background and education
Lord Howe was the son of the Royal Navy commander and film actor George Curzon, grandson of the 3rd Earl Howe and wife Jane Victoria Fergusson. He was educated at King's Mead School, Seaford, Rugby School, and Christ Church, Oxford, where he graduated in "Mods and Greats" in 1973 and, according to his Who's Who entry, earned the Chancellor's Prize in Latin Verse.

Business and political career
After leaving university in 1973, he joined Barclays Bank and served in a number of managerial and senior managerial posts in London and in other countries. After succeeding his second cousin as 7th Earl Howe in 1984, he left banking to concentrate on his Parliamentary activities and on running the family farm (Seagraves Farm Co Ltd) and estate at Penn in south Buckinghamshire. In 1991, Howe became a Lord in Waiting (Government whip in the House of Lords) with responsibilities, successively, for transport, employment, defence and environment. Following the 1992 general election he was appointed Parliamentary Secretary at the Ministry of Agriculture, Fisheries and Food and in 1995 Parliamentary Under-Secretary of State at the Ministry of Defence, a post he relinquished at the 1997 general election.

Howe was opposition spokesman for Health and Social Services in the House of Lords between 1997 and 2010. Howe was unique in being the only member of the Conservative Party to shadow the same portfolio throughout the thirteen years of opposition. Since the House of Lords Act 1999, hereditary peers do not have the automatic right to sit in the Lords. However the Act provides for 92 hereditary peers to remain, and representatives from each faction in the House are elected under Standing Orders of the House. At the election in 1999, Howe was the sixth most popular Conservative peer (Conservatives are by far the largest party grouping of hereditary peers). Apart from his frontbench responsibilities, his special interests include penal affairs and agriculture. He is a member of the all-party groups on penal affairs, abuse investigations, pharmaceuticals, adoption, mental health and epilepsy.

Since Lord Strathclyde retired from the frontbench in January 2013, Howe has been the least-recently appointed frontbencher (chosen in 1991).

Howe was appointed Knight Grand Cross of the Order of the British Empire (GBE) in the 2021 Birthday Honours for political and parliamentary service.

Other public appointments
In 1999 Howe was appointed non-executive chairman of the London and Provincial Antique Dealers' Association (LAPADA), the country's largest trade association for the fine art and antiques trade.

Involved in many charitable commitments, Howe is:
President of the Abbeyfield Beaconsfield Society
President of Penn and Tylers Green Residents Society
Patron of the Chiltern Society;
Patron of Design & Manufacture for Disability (DEMAND)
Hereditary Governor of the King William IV Naval Foundation.
a trustee of Milton's Cottage
President of the Epilepsy Society, formerly the National Society for Epilepsy, for 25 years until his wife Countess Howe became president in September 2010.
a trustee of RAFT (Restoration of Appearance and Function Trust);
a member of the Committee of Management of the RNLI;
a trustee of Sir William Borlase's Grammar School in Marlow, Buckinghamshire;
President of the South Buckinghamshire Association for the Disabled;
Honorary Treasurer of the Trident Trust
a trustee of Penn Street Village Hall
a Vice-President at Knotty Green Cricket Club

Personal life
Lord Howe married Elizabeth Helen Stuart, elder daughter of Captain Burleigh Edward St Lawrence Stuart, on 26 March 1983. They have four children:

Lady Anna Elizabeth Curzon (19 January 1987) who studied music at the University of Nottingham.
Lady Flora Grace Curzon (12 June 1989)
Lady Lucinda Rose Curzon (12 October 1991)
Thomas Edward Penn Curzon, Viscount Curzon (22 October 1994)

Countess Howe is active in the Buckinghamshire community, serving as a Deputy Lord Lieutenant from 1995 before becoming Lord Lieutenant in 2020. 
The family live at Penn House, Penn, Buckinghamshire, seat of the Earls Howe.

See also
Investigatory Powers Act 2016

References

External links
Profile for Earl Howe @ Conservatives.com
 Page on House of Lords website containing a register of Earl Howe's interests (current)
 Page on House of Lords website containing a register of Earl Howe's interests (historic)

1951 births
Living people
Alumni of Christ Church, Oxford
Conservative Party (UK) Baronesses- and Lords-in-Waiting
Frederick
7
Frederick
Knights Grand Cross of the Order of the British Empire
Members of the Privy Council of the United Kingdom
People educated at Rugby School
Hereditary peers elected under the House of Lords Act 1999